Thalara (Nepali: थलारा ) is a Gaupalika(Nepali: गाउपालिका ; gaupalika) in Bajhang District in the Sudurpashchim Province of far-western Nepal. 
Thalara has a population of 17952.The land area is 105.51 km2.

References

Rural municipalities in Bajhang District
Rural municipalities of Nepal established in 2017